Asia Pacific Resources International Holdings Limited, or APRIL, is a developer of fibre plantations and the owner of one of the world's largest pulp and paper mills with operations mainly in Indonesia and China. APRIL mainly produces bleached hardwood kraft pulp and uncoated, wood-free paper, including its Paperone brand of office paper. Founded in 1993, APRIL is managed by Royal Golden Eagle and owned by Indonesian business man Sukanto Tanoto living in Singapore. Royal Golden Eagle also manages companies in paper, palm oil, construction, and energy business sectors.

Riau Andalan Pulp and Paper 
APRIL's main pulp and paper subsidiary is Riau Andalan Pulp & Paper. PT RAPP, usually called RAPP Riau, operates in Riau Province, Sumatra, Indonesia. APRIL's pulp and paper mill located at Pangkalan Kerinci in Riau Province, Sumatra, Indonesia is capable of producing up to 2.8 million tonnes of pulp and 1.15 million tonnes of paper per year. Beginning operation in 1995, Friends of the Earth called RAPP the biggest paper pulp mill in the world, with a capacity of 2 million tonnes per year.

Sustainability

Certification
In June 2015, APRIL became the first Indonesian forest company to receive the sustainable forest management certification from the Programme for the Endorsement of Forest Certification. The company previously received their chain-of-custody certification in 2010 for its manufacturing operations.

It was later accepted as an international stakeholder member by the Programme for the Endorsement of Forest Certification in February 2016.

APRIL's operations are also certified under OHSAS 18001 (Safety Management Systems), ISO 9001 (Quality Management Systems), and ISO 14001 (Environment Management Systems).

Eco-restoration
In 2013, APRIL established the Restorasi Ekosistem Riau project to restore, protect and manage 20,000 hectares of degraded peat forests. The eco-restoration area later expanded to 70,000 hectares in June 2015. The project is implemented in collaboration with Fauna and Flora International, The Nature Conservancy and social non-governmental organization Bidara. APRIL announced at COP21 a US$100 million investment over the course of 10 years focused on eco-restoration and conservation, in addition to doubling the eco-restoration area to 150,000 hectares.

Sustainable forest management policy
APRIL published its sustainable forest management policy in January 2014. As part of the policy, an independent stakeholder advisory committee comprising non-governmental organizations and forestry experts was set up to oversee its implementation Grievances and alleged violations of APRIL's the management policy highlighted by non-governmental organizations and civil society groups are reviewed by the stakeholder advisory committee and reported publicly at APRILdialog.com.

In June 2015, APRIL announced its enhanced sustainable forest management policy. The policy was cautiously received by non-governmental organizations and third party organisations. Greenpeace suspended its campaign against APRIL and announced it would be “watching closely to make sure that today’s announcement leads to real change on the ground.” World Wide Fund for Nature also expressed that they cautiously welcomed APRIL's enhanced Sustainable Forest Management Policy.

APRIL provides a grievance resolution procedure and a dashboard to monitor all grievance handling process in their website.

Criticism and controversies

Environmental impact
APRIL has been criticised by non-governmental organizations for contributing to deforestation in Indonesia. In 2001, Friends of the Earth accused APRIL of fuelling the deforestation of Indonesia.

In June 2015, APRIL promised to halt deforestation and announced its enhanced Sustainable Forest Management Policy. As part of the new sustainability policy, APRIL said it was moving up by four years its plans to harvest only wood from its own plantations.

Forest stewardship certification
On August 8, 2013, Germany-based non-profit certification organisation Forest Stewardship Council announced that it has ended all association with APRIL after a complaint filed by non-governmental organizations Greenpeace International, Rainforest Action Network and WWF Indonesia alleging violation of the council's policy of association.

In response, APRIL in a press statement, said that they “proactively withdrew from FSC certification of their own volition” earlier in July. As of April 2016, the company is seeking re-certification with the council.

Fire and haze issues and management
In 2013, APRIL was named one of the eight companies responsible for sending hazardous level of smog to Singapore and Malaysia.

APRIL invests in fire prevention and suppression. The company invests more than $6 million in fire fighting equipment and maintains a 700-member rapid response team. In 2015, it pioneered the Fire-Free Village Programme, an incentive-based initiative that involves working at the community level to encourage alternatives to fire as a land management tool. Under this program, APRIL also conducts community education campaign, monitors air quality and even hires and trains people to be village crew leaders to spread "no-burn" message.

In 2016, APRIL became a founding member of the Fire Free Alliance, a voluntary multi-stakeholder platform for members to share information and resources to fight forest fires in Southeast Asia. One programme implemented by the Fire Free Alliance is the Fire-Free Village Programme. In May 2016 APRIL is one of private companies involved in Indonesian Government's pilot project to establish forest fire prevention procedures, through its subsidiary PT RAPP.

APRIL management was mired for years in corruption, tax evasion and disputes with former employees. In 2011, after working in APRIL for 14 months, Alain Monie, the former French CEO filed a lawsuit against APRIL in Singapore because he did not receive his salaries, travel expenses, bonus and compensation as promised.

Alain Monie was awarded damages after the leadership refused to pay outstandings. This non-payment of dues continues to this day with reports continuously emerging in local and regional media.

References

External links 

Asia Pacific Resources International Limited Company site.
Asia Pacific Resources International Limited Company Profile on BankTrack.
Asia Pacific Resources International Limited APRIL Asia Company Profile.
Paper Tiger. A documentation on APRIL as part of the 101 East program of Al Jazeera English (video, 25 mins)
Riau Andalan Pulp and Paper News about PT RAPP Riau.
Jobs at PT. RAPP Riau Find the latest job opening at PT. Riau Andalan Pulp and Paper
April Indonesia Signs $50m Deal With European Companies
APRIL Indonesia APRIL Dialog - APRIL Dialog reports and monitors progress towards the company's sustainability policy commitments.

Pulp and paper companies of Singapore